Robin Seymour may refer to:

Robin Seymour (cyclist) (born 1971), Irish professional mountain bike racer and cyclocross racer
Robin Seymour (DJ) (1928–2020), American radio and television personality and host